Dira clytus, the Cape autumn widow, is a butterfly of the family Nymphalidae. It is found in South Africa.

The wingspan is 45–55 mm. Adults of ssp. clytus are on wing from late February to April and of ssp. eurina from late February to late March. There is one generation per year.

The larvae feed on various Poaceae species, including Ehrharta erecta, Pennisetum clandestinum, Stipa dregeana, Panicum deustrum, Stenotaphrum glabrum and Stenotaphrum secundatum.

Subspecies
Dira clytus clytus — south-western Cape
Dira clytus eurina Quickelberge, 1978 — southern Cape

References

Satyrini
Butterflies described in 1764
Taxa named by Carl Linnaeus
Butterflies of Africa